Syrnola angusta is a species of sea snail, a marine gastropod mollusk in the family Pyramidellidae, the pyrams and their allies.

Distribution
This marine species occurs off New South Wales, Australia.

References

 Iredale, T. & McMichael, D. F. (1962). A reference list of the marine Mollusca of New South Wales. The Australian Museum, Sydney, Memoir. 11 : 1-185

External links

Pyramidellidae
Gastropods described in 1951